Bill Lang (born 18 March 1956) is a British rower. He competed in the men's coxed pair event at the 1984 Summer Olympics.

References

External links
 

1956 births
Living people
British male rowers
Olympic rowers of Great Britain
Rowers at the 1984 Summer Olympics
Sportspeople from Pittsburgh